Events in the year 1934 in Japan.

Incumbents
Emperor: Hirohito
Prime Minister:
Saitō Makoto
Keisuke Okada

Governors
Aichi Prefecture: Osamu (until 11 August); Eitaro Shinohara (starting 11 August)
Akita Prefecture: Takabe Rokuzo
Aomori Prefecture: Taku Yasunobu (until 11 August); Mitsumasa Kobayashi (starting 11 August)
Ehime Prefecture: Jiro Ichinohe
Fukui Prefecture: Shigeo Odachi (until 6 April); Shunsuke Kondo (starting 6 April)
Fukushima Prefecture: Shiomi Hatakeyama (until 26 October); Ito Takehiko (starting 26 October)
Gifu Prefecture: Umekichi Miyawaki
Gunma Prefecture: Masao Kanazawa
Hiroshima Prefecture: Michio Yuzawa
Ibaraki Prefecture: Abe Kashichi
Iwate Prefecture: Hidehiko Ishiguro
Kagawa Prefecture: Yoshisuke Kinoshita
Kanagawa Prefecture: Sukenari Yokoyama
Kumamoto Prefecture: Keiichi Suzuki
Kochi Prefecture: Sakama Osamu
Kyoto Prefecture: Saito Munenori
Mie Prefecture: Hirose Hisatada (until 23 June); Saburo Hayakawa (starting 23 June)
Miyagi Prefecture: Asaji Akagi (until 10 July); Kiyoshi Nakarai (starting 10 July)
Miyazaki Prefecture: Gisuke Kinoshita (until 23 June); Seikuchi Kimishima (starting 23 June)
Nagano Prefecture: Okoda Shuzo
Niigata Prefecture: Chiba Ryo
Okinawa Prefecture: Jiro Ino
Osaka Prefecture: Shinobu Agata 
Saga Prefecture: Nagawa Fujioka (until 10 November); Shizuo Furukawa (starting 10 November)
Saitama Prefecture: Hirose Hisatada (until 10 July); Kazume Iinuma (starting 10 July)
Shiname Prefecture: Masaki Fukumura
Tochigi Prefecture: Gunzo Kayaba
Tokyo: Masayasu Kouksaka
Toyama Prefecture: Saito Itsuki
Yamagata Prefecture: Ishihara Yajiro (until 10 October); Taro Kanamori (starting 10 October)

Events
January 8 – 77 persons die and 74 are hurt, when many families and troop members are pushing each other on the platform, before entering the extra troop train in Kyoto station, according to Japanese government official confirmed report.
March 21 – 1934 Hakodate fire, Japanese government official report, 2166 persons were perished.
April – Teijin Incident: Ministry of Justice ordered the arrest of the Vice-Minister of Finance, director of the Bank of Taiwan and president of Teijin
July 3 – Teijin Incident: Prime Minister Saito dissolves the government, on receiving word that a number of cabinet ministers were also scheduled to be arrested.
September 1 – Toa Special Electric Works, as predecessor of Toa Corporation was founded in Kobe.
September 21 – 1934 Muroto typhoon
November – Military Academy Incident
Unknown date – Showa Rayon, as predecessor of Kureha, founded.

Births
January 1 – Kiyoshi Kodama, actor (d. 2011)
January 10 – Hiroyuki Nagato, actor (d. 2011)
February 3 – Noboru Akiyama, baseball pitcher (d. 2000)
March 9 – Haruko Wakita, academic (d. 2016)
April 29 – Akira Takarada, actor
June 25 – Kinya Aikawa, actor, voice actor and tarento (d. 2015)
June 26 – Toru Goto, freestyle swimmer
July 14 – Jun Hazumi, voice actor
July 25 – Kazuya Tatekabe, voice actor (d. 2015)
August 20 – Yoko Tsukasa, actress
September 20 – Takayuki Kubota, Japanese-American martial artist and actor
September 26 – Shinji Maki, comedian (d. 2013)
October 20 – Empress Michiko, wife of emperor Akihito
November 22 – Osamu Kobayashi, voice actor (d. 2011)
December 28 – Yujiro Ishihara, actor and singer (d. 1987)

Deaths
January 9 – Hakaru Hashimoto, medical scientist (b. 1881)
January 13 – Bunzō Hayata, botanist (b. 1874)
January 16 – Tokihiko Okada, silent film actor  (b. 1903)
February 24 – Sanjugo Naoki, novelist (b. 1891)
May 30 – Tōgō Heihachirō, admiral of the fleet (b. 1848)
June 26 – Naitō Torajirō, historian and Sinologist (b. 1866)
September 1 – Yumeji Takehisa, nihonga painter  (b. 1884)

See also
 List of Japanese films of the 1930s

References

 
1930s in Japan
Japan